is a fictional playable character in the Overwatch media franchise. Her first appearance was in Overwatch 2, a 2022 first-person shooter developed by Blizzard Entertainment. Kiriko's character design and gameplay mechanics draw from the imagery found in Japanese folklore and Shinto folk religion. In the game's lore, her mother trained her to be a ninja, while her grandmother taught her about spirituality and her ancestry. Combining her two matriarchal influences, Kiriko carries the power of a kitsune, which she uses to protect her native Kanezaka, a fictional Japanese city.

She was the first playable Overwatch character announced following the end of Overwatch 2s beta testing period, as well as the first character made available through a battle pass unlock. Blizzard's decision to make Kiriko, and all future playable heroes, locked behind a battle pass system was met with backlash and criticism from the game's player base.

Development and design 
In December 2020, Blizzard announced Kanezaka, a fictional Japanese city, would be added to the original Overwatch game as a Deathmatch map. The following month, Blizzard published fictional correspondence written by Asa Yamagami, a woman from Kanezaka. Directed toward her kidnapped husband Toshiro, Asa's letter details how the Hashimoto Clan are negatively influencing Kanezaka. The letter also mentions the Yamagamis' daughter receiving blades as a gift from Toshiro, which led some players to speculate that their daughter would be added as a playable character.

During the Microsoft & Bethesda showcase in June 2022, Blizzard presented a release date trailer for Overwatch 2. A fox-themed hero was teased during the trailer. The second beta period of Overwatch 2 ended with a cryptic message that when decoded, translated to "What does the fox say?" Rumors of a "fox girl" character named "Kimiko" began to spread online. They would permeate through September, leading Overwatch commercial leader Jon Spector to dismiss the rumors, calling them fake. Shortly after, a YouTube video of an unfinished cinematic featuring the character was leaked. In the leaked short, a gang appears at Kiriko's home with a title card labeled "Hashimoto". Ultimately, Blizzard officially announced Kiriko as a playable hero character at the Tokyo Games Show on September 15. At the event, Blizzard showcased a trailer highlighting Kiriko's gameplay mechanics. 

When she was officially released for play, Kiriko became the first support character added to Overwatchs playable roster in over three years. Sally Amaki provides the voice for Kiriko; while experienced in singing and anime voice acting, Amaki's work on Kiriko was her first foray into video game voice-over. The character's appearances on the Overwatch 2 menu screen and in her 2022 animated short are accompanied by the song "BOW" by Japanese rapper MFS. Scott Duwe of Dot Esports wrote that the song was noted by journalists during the game's early press review period and opined, "the tune is perfectly fitting for Kiriko, matching her youthful exuberance with a fiery beat underneath Japanese rap lyricism."

Gameplay and art 
Undergoing various incarnations "for about four years" prior to the release of Overwatch 2, Kiriko's design originated from concept art intended for the game's player vs. environment (PvE) mode. The game's development team originally conceived her as an enemy unit type and Aaron Tsang, the game's character art director, drew "a whole bunch of ninjas [that] could potentially be enemies." After intrigued by her streetwear-sporting design, Blizzard attempted to convert her into a playable character. Kiriko's original design saw her wield a "massive, fidget spinner-inspired throwing star" and donned a "somewhat more traditional ninjalike appearance". This design was later merged with the "traditional dress of a miko, a Shinto shrine maiden, and modern streetwear aesthetics." Meanwhile, her "comically oversized shuriken that acted liked a yo-yo or boomerang," would be repurposed for Junker Queen, another Overwatch 2 launch character. 

Kiriko's abilities are heavily influenced by spiritual objects associated with Shintoism, such as ofuda and suzu. To heal her teammates, Kiriko uses ofuda, or paper talismans which protect their wielder. She also wields kunai, which are used in her secondary fire to damage opponents. The development team experimented with a healing shotgun for Kiriko's weapon, before settling on ofuda to lean more toward a spiritual aesthetic, rather than magical tropes, which they aimed to avoid. The team also scrapped early versions of her kit that saw her as a "trickster hero", including smoke bombs and a "ninja shadow clone ability". Ultimately, however, the development team aimed to develop Kiriko with the intention of incentivizing damage per second (DPS) players to try playing the support role instead.

In contrast to the 6v6 dynamic employed in the original Overwatch, Kiriko was designed with the 5v5 structure found in Overwatch 2 in mind. Additionally, Overwatch 2 characters are "harder to play" than those in the original game, with Kiriko being "perhaps one of the most complex, and hard-to-master supports in the game," according to TechRadar. 

Qiu Fang, lead concept artist on Overwatch 2, described her as a "battle healer". Her mobility, particularly for a healer, is notable, although her main in-game role is to heal and protect allies. Her speed is comparable to that of Genji's and Tracer's, while her healing output is on par with Mercy and Moira. Due to the combination of her healing role and her fast speed, she is able to jump in and out of combat quickly, with Fang stating "not a sit-back-and-heal type of hero". According to Blizzard associate narrative designer Kyungseo Min, Kiriko's design was heavily inspired by Genji. An initial question posed by the game's development team while designing Kiriko was "How can we create a support hero that DPS players [who] like Genji would enjoy playing?" Kiriko's ability to deal considerable damage was part of the development team's aim to make their support characters more "survivable" and to remove "hard counters". Game director Aaron Keller stated, "we're trying to take some of those really hard rock, paper, scissors interactions out of the game, and [replace] them with more player choice."

Character and lore 
Like its predecessor, Overwatch 2 will lack a traditional story mode at launch, although a PvE mode set to release in 2023 is intended to tell a "complete, linear story". Like with the original Overwatch, much of the sequel's story components are disseminated to players via transmedia methods, such as a fictional letter written by Kiriko's mother. On September 20, 2022, Blizzard released a trailer for Overwatch 2, featuring a short animated origin story centered on Kiriko's upbringing. 

In the game's lore, Kiriko Kamori is a healing ninja hailing from Kanezaka. Designed based on Tokyo, the fictional city was first featured in a deathmatch map introduced in a 2021 update for Overwatch. The map is also present in Overwatch 2. Described by the game's developers as "funny", Kiriko often employs a "drive-by" and "tongue-in-cheek" humor. Kiriko's demeanor was made to match her play style ― as she blends support and offense roles in-game, she has an "in your face" attitude in battle, yet is also "traditional, reserved, and dryly witty." Kamiya Kaoru, a character from the manga and anime Rurouni Kenshin, has been cited as a source of inspiration for Kiriko's personality.

The daughter of Toshiro and Asa Yamagami, she holds the title of "Protector of Kanezaka". Her family own a business called Yamagami Blades. Her mother trained Hanzo and Genji of the Shimada Clan, a criminal gang of ninjas. In her youth, Kiriko joined in on this training and the Shimada brothers came to view Kiriko as a "cute, little niece figure". After the fall of the Shimada clan, less moral criminal organizations emerged. Following the Shimadas departing Kanezaka, Kiriko's father was abducted by another clan and the Yamagami Blades shop was forced to close. Along with other "young gifted individuals called the Yokai", Kiriko protects the streets of Kanezaka.

In addition to being trained by her mother, Kiriko is also strongly influenced by her grandmother, who taught her about spirituality and her ancestral history with the Kanezaka Shrine, as well as protective and healing abilities. According to Min, Kiriko acts as a "bridge between her grandmother's spiritual thinking and more modern beliefs." She carries the power of a kitsune, a fox that possess spiritual powers.

Gameplay 
Kiriko is classified as a "support" character, but is noted to be both a damage dealer and healer. Overwatch 2 associate narrative designer Kyungseo Min described Kiriko as a "high-mobility, single-target hybrid healer". Kiriko's primary fire is her "Healing Ofuda", which sends ofuda to her teammates in order to heal them. The ability is fired in a series of five slow-moving projectiles that home in on allies. Her secondary fire, "Kunai", allows players to use her kunai blades as fast projectiles able to damage opponents with a higher crit multiplier than the rest of the playable roster. Although the critical damage dealt by the projectiles can be high for accurate players, the kunai blades deal low overall damage. Like Genji and Hanzo, Kiriko also has a passive wall climbing ability.

Her kit also includes the "Swift Step" ability, which allows her to see allies through barriers and quickly teleport to friendly players, even through walls. As she can teleport beside teammates, even through walls, she is the first Overwatch character able to phase through walls. She also has the "Protection Suzu" ability, which releases a small bell area of effect (AOE) that makes any ally within briefly invulnerable. The ability also cleanses debuffs, even those implemented by Ultimate abilities. However, the ability comes with a lengthy 14-second-long cooldown period. Finally, her "Kitsune Rush" ultimate ability projects a path of torii in front of Kiriko that buffs her and summons a kitsune that provides teammates with "accelerated movement speed, attack speed, and cooldown rates."

Appearances

Video games 
Along with Junker Queen and Sojourn, Kiriko is among the first three new playable characters included in Overwatch 2. 

Unlike its predecessor, Overwatch 2 will have a battle pass system. Junker Queen and Sojourn will be unlocked by players automatically, whether they are new or returning. Kiriko, however, will need to be unlocked through the game's battle pass, making her the first Overwatch character to hold the distinction. The game's season one battle pass is set to start concurrently with the game's early access launch on October 4, 2022. Characters are also included within the battle pass, making players have to unlock Kiriko. This is unlike in Overwatch, where all characters were made freely available, making Kiriko the first Overwatch character made available through a battle pass unlock. Players will be able to unlock Kiriko at level 55 out of 80 on the free track battle pass. However, a premium version of the battle pass, available for $10, unlocks her immediately. To promote the game's launch, Blizzard will be automatically giving owners of the original Overwatch who log in during Overwatch 2s first season the premium battle pass, and therefore access to Kiriko. While those who unlocked Kiriko were able to play as her on Unranked and Arcade game modes at launch, there was a two-week probation period on the character for the game's Competitive game mode. This was done to allow players a chance to test her abilities out before utilizing her in the more intense ranked matches.

Other media 
Kiriko, an animated short featuring the character was released the same week as Overwatch 2, premiering at TwitchCon on October 7, 2022. The short delves into Kiriko's relationship with her mother and features her fighting the Hashimoto, a yakuza-like group, and giving aide to a deaf child. The latter character was included as a nod to a deaf Overwatch player that had developed American sign language gestures for each of the heroes in the game. 

Yokai, a short story authored by Christie Golden, was also released to help outline Kiriko's back story and connection to the broader Overwatch lore.

Reception 
After her reveal, Adam Benjamin commented, "Kiriko almost seems like she was engineered in a lab to appeal to players. You like playing support? Here you go. You like ninjas? Ta-da. Foxes? Your ultimate is a fox. And, honestly, that laboratory formula is working." Jessica Howard of GameSpot wrote that Kiriko "exerts a sort of youthful energy and intelligence that makes her incredibly personable."

As she was the first Overwatch character included as a battle pass reward, Kiriko was often cited alongside examples of player criticism directed toward Overwatch 2s adoption of a battle pass system. While the game's battle pass received general backlash from players, CJ Wheeler of Rock Paper Shotgun noted that "at least people seem to like Kiriko."

References 

Animal characters in video games
Female characters in animated films
Female characters in video games
Female superheroes
Fictional blade and dart throwers
Fictional characters from Mikawa Province
Fictional characters who can turn intangible
Fictional characters with healing abilities
Fictional female ninja
Fictional foxes
Fictional Japanese people in video games
Fictional miko
Fictional yōkai
Ninja characters in video games
Overwatch characters
Religious worker characters in video games
Shapeshifter characters in video games
Video game characters introduced in 2022
Video game characters who can teleport
Vigilante characters in video games